Cova or COVA may refer to:

Places and jurisdictions

Algeria 
 Cova, North Africa, the Ancient Roman city and modern Catholic titular see located at modern Ziama Mansouriah

Cape Verde 
 Cova Figueira, a small city in the island of Fogo
 Cova (crater), a caldera in the island of Santo Antão
 Cova-Paul-Ribeira da Torre Natural Park, a protected area on the island of Santo Antão

Portugal 
 Cova, Portugal, a parish in the municipality of Vieira do Minho

United States 
 Commonwealth of Virginia (COVA), a U.S. state

Persons 
 Alberto Cova (born 1958), Italian long-distance track athlete